Paris's 19th constituency was one of the 21 French National Assembly constituencies
in the Paris department in the period 1988 to 2012. It was abolished in the 2010 redistricting of French legislative constituencies, which reduced the number of constituencies in Paris to 18.  The territory of the 19th constituency, in the north of Paris, corresponds almost exactly with the post-2012 17th constituency.

Description
After the 1986 French legislative election, the new Prime Minister Jacques Chirac re-established the two-round single-member district electoral system. The number of deputies from Paris was maintained at 21 and the previous (pre-1986) electoral constituencies were therefore reduced from 31 to 21. The whole of the former 27th, part of the former 28th and part of the former 29th constituencies formed the new nineteenth constituency. From the 1988 election to the 2010 redistricting, the constituency covered two districts of the 18th arrondissement (Goutte-d'Or and La Chapelle) and one district of the 19th arrondissement (La Villette).

In 1999, the Institut national de la statistique et des études économiques estimated the population of the constituency as 106,141 inhabitants.

Historic Representation

Election Results

1988 

|- style="background-color:#E9E9E9;text-align:center;"
! colspan="2" rowspan="2" style="text-align:left;" | Candidate
! rowspan="2" colspan="2" style="text-align:left;" | Party
! colspan="2" | 1st round
! colspan="2" | 2nd round
|- style="background-color:#E9E9E9;text-align:center;"
! width="75" | Votes
! width="30" | %
! width="75" | Votes
! width="30" | %
|-
| style="background-color:" |
| style="text-align:left;" | Daniel Vaillant
| style="text-align:left;" | Socialist Party
| PS
| 8,070
| 32.25
| 14,634
| 54.72
|-
| style="background-color:" |
| 
| UDF (Social Democratic Party)
| UDF (PSD)
|8,061
|32.21
|12,108
|45.27
|-
| style="background-color:" |
| Patrice de Blignières
| National Front
| FN
| 3,371
| 13.47
| colspan="2" rowspan="7" |
|-
| style="background-color:" |
|Louis Baillot
| Communist Party
| PCF
| 2,251
| 8.99
|-
|
|Manuel Escutia
| Socialist Party dissident
|diss. PS
| 1,889
| 7.54
|-
| 
| Louis Girard
| Extreme Right
| EXD
| 1,028
| 4.10
|-
|
| Sauveur Boukris
| Miscellaneous right
| DVD
| 228
| 0.91
|-
|
|Anne-Marie Desachy
|POE
|87
|0.34
|-
|
|Pascal Jouvin
| Miscellaneous right
| DVD
|37
|0.14
|-
| colspan="8" |
|-
| colspan="4" |Registered Voters
|45,595
|100.00
|45,595
|100.00
|-
| colspan="4" |Abstentions
|20,229
|44.37
|18,106
|39.71
|-
| colspan="4" |Votes
|25,366
|55.63
|27,489
|60.29
|-
| colspan="4" |Blank or Void ballots
|344
|1.36
|747
|2.72
|-
| colspan="4" |Total Votes
|25,022
|98.64
|26,742
|97.28
|-
| colspan="8" |Source : Le Monde, 7 and 14 June 1988
|}

1993 

Table Notes 1993:

1994 by-election 
Jean-Pierre Pierre-Bloch's election in 1993 was annulled by the Constitutional Council, and a by-election held on 30 January and 8 February 1994.

1997

Table Notes 1997:

2002

Table Notes 2002:

2007

References 

Defunct French legislative constituencies
French legislative constituencies of Paris
2010 disestablishments in France
Constituencies disestablished in 2010